In mathematics, the bipolar theorem is a theorem in functional analysis that characterizes the bipolar (that is, the polar of the polar) of a set. 
In convex analysis, the bipolar theorem refers to a necessary and sufficient conditions for a cone to be equal to its bipolar.  The bipolar theorem can be seen as a special case of the Fenchel–Moreau theorem.

Preliminaries

Suppose that  is a topological vector space (TVS) with a continuous dual space  and let  for all  and  
The convex balanced hull of a set  is the smallest convex balanced set containing 

The polar of a subset  is defined to be: 
 
while the prepolar of a subset  is:

Statement in functional analysis

The bipolar theorem: The bipolar of a subset  is equal to the -closure of the convex balanced hull of

Statement in convex analysis

The bipolar theorem: For any nonempty cone  in some linear space  the bipolar set  is given by:

Special case

A subset  is a nonempty closed convex cone if and only if  when  where  denotes the positive dual cone of a set 
Or more generally, if  is a nonempty convex cone then the bipolar cone is given by

Relation to the Fenchel–Moreau theorem

Let 
 
be the indicator function for a cone 
Then the convex conjugate, 
 
Therefore,  if and only if

See also

 
  − A generalization of the bipolar theorem.

References

Bibliography

  
  
  

Convex analysis
Functional analysis
Theorems in analysis
Linear functionals